The 2005–06 Liga Premier, also known as the TM Liga Premier due to sponsorship reasons, was the third season of the Liga Premier, the second-tier professional football league in Malaysia.

The season began on 4 December 2005 and concluded on 22 May 2006.

The champions for the 2005–06 season was Kedah which defeated Malacca during the final with a score of 1–0. Both clubs were promoted to the 2006–07 Malaysia Super League.

League table

Group A

Group B

Note:

 Due to exclusion of Public Bank who was relegated from the 2005 Malaysia Super League and MK Land, who were suspended for five years from all competitions due to pulling out of the Malaysian League, the relegations of Malacca and PDRM were revoked and both teams remained in the Premier League for the 2005–06 season.
 Jenderata changed its name to UPB to reflect its ownership.
 For the 2005–06 season, the Football Association of Brunei entered a club team, DPMM, rather than the squad from national team, the Brunei.

Final

References

Malaysia Premier League seasons
2005 in Malaysian football
2006 in Malaysian football
Malay